Off and Running is a 1991 American comedy mystery film starring singer and actress Cyndi Lauper, David Keith and directed by Edward Bianchi.

Plot 
Lauper stars as a mermaid-themed lounge singer who gets involved with a caring but troubled man played by Jose Perez. Because of his involvement with horse racing and breeding (and consequent mafia ties), the man is murdered in front of her, and she goes on the lam to escape his killers. On the way, she takes on the company of a professional golfer and a rebellious pre-teen boy, and together they attempt to unravel the mystery behind her slain lover's past.

Cast 
Cyndi Lauper as Cyd Morse
David Keith as Jack Cornett
Johnny Pinto as Pompey
David Thornton as Reese
Richard Belzer as Milt Zoloth
José Pérez as J.W. (Woody) Vilela
Anita Morris as Florence
Hazen Gifford as John K. Sasser
Linda Hart as Gina Pompelli
Tracy Roberts as Patti
Dana Mark as April
Heather Davis as Loree
Sy Bondy as Norman
Tony Jones as Curtis Valentine
George Richards as Auctioneer
Steven Reibel as Bid Spotter
Mark Harris as Shriner
Daniel L. Tasciotti as Interviewer
Sydney Sandnes as Desk Clerk
Jodi Lyn Wilson as Hostess (as Jodi Wilson)
Gary Snow as Yuppie Father
Nancy Duerr as Yuppie Wife
Jonathan Dreyer as Yuppie Boy
Nelson Oramas as State Trooper
Joshua Spencer as Kid #1
Kelly Scarberry as Little Girl
Tim Hawkins as Banjo Man
Harold Bergman as Sy
Mary Alvarez as Reporter
Jeff Rosenberg as Rich Playboy

Release 
The film was not widely distributed and coasted into notability mainly because of Lauper's involvement. It is generally available on VHS for less than a dollar. The film fared far better in other countries where Lauper's popularity has sustained.

In Germany and Japan it was released under the title Moon Over Miami.

External links 
 

1991 films
1991 comedy films
1990s comedy mystery films
1990s English-language films
American comedy mystery films
Films about singers
Films directed by Ed Bianchi
Films scored by Mason Daring
Films shot in Florida
Films shot in New York City
Films shot in West Virginia
Films with screenplays by Mitch Glazer
Mafia films
Orion Pictures films
1990s American films